This is a list of Rangers Football Club's managers and all those who have held the position of manager of the first team of Rangers, since its formation in 1872.

Each manager's entry includes his dates of tenure and the club's overall competitive record (in terms of first team matches won, drawn and lost), honours won and significant achievements while under his care. Caretaker or interim managers are included, where known, as well as those who have been in permanent charge. Rangers have had eighteen different permanent managers and nine interim managers.

Managerial history

Match secretaries
Prior to the club forming a corporate entity in June 1899, Rangers had a series of match secretaries who filled the role of what would have been the manager.

Managers
The most successful and longest-serving Rangers manager is Bill Struth, who won eighteen Scottish league championships, ten Scottish Cups, two League Cups, seven war-time league championships, nineteen Glasgow Cups and seventeen Glasgow Merchant Charity Cups from 1920 to 1954.

The club has, on average, appointed a new manager every seven and a half years. The club's directors have only dismissed four of their managers, namely David White, Jock Wallace (during his second spell), Pedro Caixinha and Giovanni Van Bronckhorst. The others have left of their own accord or by mutual agreement, except for William Wilton, who died whilst still manager of the club.

Statistics

List of match secretaries
1875-1876 John Campbell
1876-1883 Peter McNeil
1883-1885 John Wallace MacKay
1885-1889 James Gossland
1889-1899 William Wilton

List of managers
Information correct as of matches played 28 December 2022. Only competitive matches are included.

{| class="wikitable sortable"
|-
!Name!!From!!class="unsortable"|To!!Tenure!!P!!W!!D!!L!!GF!!GA!!Win%!!Honours
|-
|align=left| 
|align=left|
|align=left|
|align=center|
|align=center|
|align=center|
|align=center|
|align=center|
|align=center|
|align=center|
|align=center|
|8 1st-tier League titles1 Scottish Cup
|-
|align=left| 
|align=left|
|align=left|
|align=center|
|align=center|
|align=center|
|align=center|
|align=center|
|align=center|
|align=center|
|align=center|
|18 First-tier League titles10 Scottish Cups2 League Cups
|-
|align=left| 
|align=left|
|align=left|
|align=center|
|align=center|
|align=center|
|align=center|
|align=center| 
|align=center| 
|align=center| 
|align=center|
|6 First-tier League titles5 Scottish Cups4 League Cups
|-
|align=left| 
|align=left|
|align=left|
|align=center|
|align=center|
|align=center|
|align=center|
|align=center|
|align=center|
|align=center|
|align=center|
|
|-
|align=left| †
|align=left|
|align=left|
|align=center|
|align=center|
|align=center|
|align=center|
|align=center|
|align=center|
|align=center|
|align=center|
|
|-
|align=left| 
|align=left|
|align=left|
|align=center|
|align=center|
|align=center|
|align=center|
|align=center|
|align=center|
|align=center|
|align=center|
|1 League Cup1 Cup Winners' Cup
|-
|align=left| 
|align=left|
|align=left|
|align=center|
|align=center|
|align=center|
|align=center|
|align=center|
|align=center|
|align=center|
|align=center|
|3 First-tier League titles3 Scottish Cups2 League Cups
|-
|align=left| 
|align=left|
|align=left|
|align=center|
|align=center|
|align=center|
|align=center|
|align=center|
|align=center|
|align=center|
|align=center|
|2 Scottish Cups2 League Cups
|-
|align=left| †
|align=left|
|align=left|
|align=center|
|align=center|
|align=center|
|align=center|
|align=center|
|align=center|
|align=center|
|align=center|
|
|-
|align=left| 
|align=left|
|align=left|
|align=center|
|align=center|
|align=center|
|align=center|
|align=center|
|align=center|
|align=center|
|align=center|
|2 League Cups
|-
|align=left| †
|align=left|
|align=left|
|align=center|
|align=center|
|align=center|
|align=center|
|align=center|
|align=center|
|align=center|
|align=center|
|
|-
|align=left| †
|align=left|
|align=left|
|align=center|
|align=center|
|align=center|
|align=center|
|align=center|
|align=center|
|align=center|
|align=center|
|
|-
|align=left| 
|align=left|
|align=left|
|align=center|
|align=center|
|align=center|
|align=center|
|align=center|
|align=center|
|align=center|
|align=center|
|3 1st-tier League titles4 League Cups
|-
|align=left| 
|align=left|
|align=left|
|align=center|
|align=center|
|align=center|
|align=center|
|align=center|
|align=center|
|align=center|
|align=center|
|7 First-tier League titles3 Scottish Cups3 League Cups
|-
|align=left| 
|align=left|
|align=left|
|align=center|
|align=center|
|align=center|
|align=center|
|align=center|
|align=center|
|align=center|
|align=center|
|2 First-tier League titles2 Scottish Cups1 League Cup
|-
|align=left| 
|align=left|
|align=left|
|align=center|
|align=center|
|align=center|
|align=center|
|align=center|
|align=center|
|align=center|
|align=center|
|2 First-tier League titles2 Scottish Cups3 League Cups
|-
|align=left|  
|align=left| 
|align=left|
|align=center|
|align=center|
|align=center|
|align=center|
|align=center|
|align=center|
|align=center|
|align=center|
|
|-
|align=left| †
|align=left|
|align=left|
|align=center|
|align=center|
|align=center|
|align=center|
|align=center|
|align=center|
|align=center|
|align=center|
|
|-
|align=left| 
|align=left|
|align=left|
|align=center|
|align=center|
|align=center|
|align=center|
|align=center|
|align=center|
|align=center|
|align=center|
|3 First-tier League titles2 Scottish Cups3 League Cups
|-
|align=left| 
|align=left|
|align=left|
|align=center|
|align=center|
|align=center|
|align=center|
|align=center|
|align=center|
|align=center|
|align=center|
|1 Fourth-tier league title1 Third-tier league title
|-
|align=left| †
|align=left|
|align=left|
|align=center|
|align=center|
|align=center|
|align=center|
|align=center|
|align=center|
|align=center|
|align=center|
|
|-
|align=left| † 
|align=left|
|align=left|
|align=center|
|align=center|
|align=center|
|align=center|
|align=center|
|align=center|
|align=center|
|align=center|
|
|-
|align=left| 
|align=left|
|align=left|
|align=center|
|align=center|
|align=center|
|align=center| 
|align=center|
|align=center|
|align=center|
|align=center|
|1 Second-tier league title1 Challenge Cup
|-
|align=left| †
|align=left|
|align=left|
|align=center|
|align=center|
|align=center|
|align=center|
|align=center|
|align=center|
|align=center|
|align=center|
|
|-
| 
|align=left|
|align=left|
|align=center|
|align=center|
|align=center|
|align=center|
|align=center|
|align=center|
|align=center|
|align=center|
|
|-
|align=left| †
|align=left|
|align=left| 
|align=center|
|align=center|
|align=center|
|align=center|
|align=center|
|align=center|
|align=center|
|align=center|
|
|-
|align=left| †
|align=left|
|align=left|
|align=center|
|align=center|
|align=center|
|align=center|
|align=center|
|align=center|
|align=center|
|align=center|
|
|-
|align=left|  
|align=left|
|11 November 2021
|align=center|
|align=center|
|align=center|
|align=center|
|align=center|
|align=center|
|align=center|
|align=center|
||1 First-tier League title
|-
|align=left|  
|align=left|
|align=center|
|align=center|
|align=center|
|align=center|
|align=center|
|align=center|
|align=center|
|align=center|
|align=center|
||1 Scottish Cup

|-
|align=left| 
|align=left|
|align=left|
|align=center|
|align=center|
|align=center|
|align=center| 
|align=center|
|align=center|
|align=center|
|align=center|
|<small>
|-
|}
† Denotes that the person was a caretaker manager.

References

External links
 Rangers official website - Former managers

Managers
 
Rangers
Managers